Dessler is a surname. Notable people with the surname include:
 Alexander Dessler (born 1928), American space scientist
 Andrew Dessler (born 1964), American climate scientist
 Eliyahu Eliezer Dessler (1892–1953), Belorussion-British Orthodox Jewish rabbi, Talmudic scholar and philosopher (son of Reuven Dov)
 Michelle Dessler, fictional character in American television series 24
 Nachum Zev Dessler (1921–2011), American Orthodox Jewish rabbi, founder of the Hebrew Academy of Cleveland
 Reuven Dov Dessler (1863–1935), Latvian Jewish leader of the Musar movement

See also
 Dassler, a surname